Heppia is a genus of olive, brownish, gray, or blackish squamulose, crustose, or peltate like lichens. Heppia was once the type genus of the family Heppiaceae, but that family was folded into synonymy with Lichinaceae.

The genus name of Heppiella is in honour of Johann Adam Philipp Hepp (1797–1867), a German physician and lichenologist.

The genus was circumscribed by Carl Wilhelm von Nägeli and Abramo Bartolommeo Massalongo in Geneac. Lich. (Verona) 7-8 in 1854.

Description
Heppia species grow on rock or soil in arid sites around the world, in habitats similar to those favored by Peltula, which is similar but has a different cyanobacterium as the photobiont. It lacks a medulla that is separate from the photobiont layer. It is a cyanolichen with the photobiont cyanobacterium being Syctonema (or Syctonema-like). The lower surface is paler than upper surface, and has numerous rhizoidal hyphae attaching it to the substrate. The fruiting structures (ascomata) are apothecias immersed in the thallus with red to red-brown urn shaped (urceolate) to flat or slightly convex discs. An exciple may or may not be present.

Species
 Heppia adglutinata 
 Heppia arenacea 
 Heppia conchiloba 
 Heppia despreauxii 
 Heppia lutosa

References

Ascomycota genera
Lichen genera
Lichinomycetes
Taxa named by Abramo Bartolommeo Massalongo